Lovedolls Superstar is a soundtrack album to accompany the
film of the same name by Dave Markey.
Music Score by Jeff McDonald, Abby  Travis, Kristian Hoffman, Mario Lalli,
Paul Roessler, Andrew Weiss, & Sim Cain Featuring Music by Redd Kross,
Sonic Youth, Meat Puppets,  Dead Kennedys, Painted Willie,
Swa, Lawndale, Annette Zilinskas, Anarchy  6, & The  Lovedolls

Soundtrack originally released on SST Records.

A different version of the soundtrack was made available for free download on Dave Markey's We Got Power Films web site.

Track listing 
 Redd Kross - "Lovedoll Superstar" (Jeff McDonald) - 2:47
 The Lovedolls - "Beer & Ludes" (Jeff McDonald) - 5:54
 The Lovedolls - "Rex Smith 9 (I Wanna Be a Cholo Chick)" (Jeff McDonald) - 3:09
 The Lovedolls - "Now That I've Tasted Blood" (K. Pilkington) - 3:15
 The Lovedolls - "Sunshine Day" (K. Pilkington) - 2:36
 Black Flag - "Kickin' & Stickin'" (Greg Ginn/Henry Rollins) - 1:24
 Redd Kross - "Purple Haze" (Jimi Hendrix) - 2:51
 Annette - "Baby Don't Go" (Sonny Bono) - 3:22
 Gone - "Slick's Thang" (Gone) - 2:02
 The Lovedolls - "The Love Machine" (Chuck Dukowski/Greg Ginn/Jordan Schwartz) - 2:32
 Sonic Youth - "Hallowed Be Thy Name" (Neal "Nervous" Smith) - 2:36
 Painted Willie - "Darling Shelah" (P. Rince) - 2:37
 Lawndale - "Wingtips" (Rick Lawndale) - 2:01
 Gone - "Lord of the Wasteland" (Gone) - 1:07
 Anarchy 6 - "Slam, Spit, Cut Your Hair, Kill Your Mom!" (Dave Markey/Steven Shane McDonald) - 1:05
 Gone - "Goodbye Forever" (Gone) - 1:48
 Meat Puppets - "No Values" (Greg Ginn) - 1:37
 Gone - "Atomic Jam" (Gone) - 2:26
 Dead Kennedys - "One-Way Ticket to Pluto" (Jello Biafra/Dead Kennedys) - 1:42
 Gone - "I Won't Stick Any of You Unless and Until I Can Stick All of You" (Gone) - 2:09
 Gone - "March" (Gone) - 1:19
 Gone - "Material Jam" (Gone) - 2:48
 Gone - "A Day in India (On Acid)" (Gone) - 1:47

See also
 Desperate Teenage Lovedolls
 Desperate Teenage Lovedolls (soundtrack)
 Lovedolls Superstar (film)

References

External links
 We Got Power Films - Soundtrack available for download

1986 soundtrack albums
SST Records soundtracks
Alternative rock soundtracks